Arablyar (Ərəblər) is a rural locality (a selo) in Mollakentsky Selsoviet, Kurakhsky District, Republic of Dagestan, Russia. The population was 514 as of 2010. There are 20 streets.

Geography
Arablyar is located 88 km northeast of Kurakh (the district's administrative centre) by road. Mollakent and Avadan are the nearest rural localities.

Nationalities 
Lezgins and Azerbaijanis live there.

References 

Rural localities in Kurakhsky District